Gnidia socotrana is a species of plant in the Thymelaeaceae family. It is endemic to Yemen.  Its natural habitats are subtropical or tropical dry forests and subtropical or tropical dry shrubland.

References

	

Endemic flora of Socotra
Least concern plants
Taxonomy articles created by Polbot
Thymelaeoideae